Girisagar  is a village in the southern state of Karnataka, India. It is located in the Bilagi taluka of Bagalkot district in Karnataka.

Demographics
 India census, Girisagar had a population of 6,420 with 3,216 males and 3,204 females.

See also
 Bagalkot
 Districts of Karnataka

References

External links
 http://Bagalkot.nic.in/

Villages in Bagalkot district